Epsilon Sagittae (ε Sagittae) is a solitary, yellow-hued star in the northern constellation of Sagitta. With an apparent visual magnitude of +5.64 to +5.67, it is faintly visible to the naked eye on a dark night. It is a variable star with a small amplitude of 0.03 magnitudes. Based upon an annual parallax shift of 5.60 mas as seen from Earth, it is located roughly 580 light years from the Sun. At that distance, the visual magnitude of the star is diminished by an extinction factor of 0.1 due to interstellar dust.

This is an evolved, G-type giant star with a stellar classification of G8 IIIvar, where the 'var' suffix indicates a variable spectral feature. The star is about 331 million years old with three times the mass of the Sun. It is radiating 185 times the Sun's luminosity from its photosphere at an effective temperature of 4,966 K.

Epsilon Sagittae is an optical binary, with a companion of magnitude 8.35 at an angular separation of 87.3 arc seconds along a position angle of 82°, as of 2013. The companion is actually a more distant giant star approximately 7,000 light-years from Earth, with a luminosity 1,800 times that of the Sun and also designated HD 232029.

References

G-type giants
Sagittae, Epsilon
Sagitta (constellation)
Durchmusterung objects
Sagittae, 04
185194
096516
7463